Seibold may refer to:

Anthony Seibold, Rockhampton, Queensland born former professional rugby league footballer, Football Manager at Celtic Crusaders
Champ Seibold (1911–1971), professional American football player who played offensive lineman
Emil Seibold, Hauptscharführer in the Waffen SS during World War II, was awarded the Knight's Cross of the Iron Cross
Günter Seibold (born 1936), retired German football player
Gerhard Seibold (born 1943), Austrian sprint canoeist
J. Otto Seibold, illustrator, mainly of children's books
Rick Seibold (born 1983), American singer-songwriter from Wilmington, North Carolina, now based in Nashville, Tennessee
Socks Seibold (1896–1965), Major League Baseball pitcher
Steven Seibold, American industrial musician and founder of Hate Dept.

See also
 Seabold
 Sebald (disambiguation)
 Sebold (disambiguation)
 Siebold
 Sypolt

Surnames of German origin
German-language surnames
Surnames from given names